Robert Scholes (December 5, 1866 – October 23, 1929) was an American politician and lawyer.

Born in Peoria, Illinois, Scholes was admitted to the Illinois bar in 1899 and then practiced law in Peoria. From 1904 to 1912, Scholes was state's attorney for Peoria County, Illinois and was a Republican. From 1917 until his death in 1929, Scholes served in the Illinois House of Representatives and was twice speaker of the house in 1925 and 1927. Scholes died in his home, in Peoria, Illinois, from a heart ailment and ill health.

Notes

1866 births
1929 deaths
District attorneys in Illinois
Politicians from Peoria, Illinois
Illinois lawyers
Speakers of the Illinois House of Representatives
Republican Party members of the Illinois House of Representatives